John Seymour (by 1523–1567), of Great Marlow, Buckinghamshire, was an English politician.

He was a Member (MP) of the Parliament of England for Great Bedwyn in 1545.

References

1567 deaths
English MPs 1545–1547
Year of birth uncertain
People from Great Marlow
Members of Parliament for Great Bedwyn